Karl Heineken (died 4 January 1830), also known as Carlos Heineken, was a German medical doctor and ornithologist.  He lived on Madeira, a Portuguese island in Macaronesia, from 1826 until his death.  He described the Trocaz pigeon, a Madeiran endemic bird species.  He is commemorated in the scientific name of a subspecies of blackcap, Sylvia atricapilla heineken.

References

1830 deaths
German ornithologists
Year of birth unknown